"" is the 9th single by Zard and released 4 September 1993 under B-Gram Records label. The single debuted at #2 rank first week. It charted for 12 weeks and sold over 844,000 copies.

Track list
All songs are written by Izumi Sakai, composed by Seiichiro Kuribayashi and arranged by Masao Akashi

the song was used in TV Asahi drama Lalabai Keiji as ending theme

 (original karaoke)
(original karaoke)

References

1993 singles
Zard songs
Songs written by Izumi Sakai
1993 songs
Songs written by Seiichiro Kuribayashi